Tromm is the trade name for washers and dryers manufactured by LG Electronics. 

All Tromm washers are front-loading and feature a direct drive motor for greater reliability. High-end washers feature SteamWash, a proprietary technology that does not immerse clothing in water and allows it to be quickly refreshed.  Some Tromm washers have a capacity of  IEC) . 

Tromm washers spin at up to 1350 rpm to promote faster clothes drying.

References 

LG Electronics
Home appliance brands